Qualifications for Men's artistic gymnastic competitions at the 2011 Pan American Games was held at the Nissan Gymnastics Stadium on October 25. The results of the qualification determined the qualifiers to the finals: 24 gymnasts in the all-around final, and 8 gymnasts in each of 6 apparatus finals.

Qualification results

All-Around qualifiers

References

Gymnastics at the 2011 Pan American Games